Aliabad-e Dashti (also Romanized as ‘Alīābād-e Dashtī) is a village in Fahraj Rural District, in the Central District of Yazd County, Yazd Province, Iran. At the 2006 census, its population was 149, in 24 families.

References 

Populated places in Yazd County